Raza Razai (born February 16, 1980) is an Afghan football player. He has played for Afghanistan national team.

National team statistics

External links

1980 births
Living people
Afghan footballers
Association football forwards
Afghanistan international footballers